The Yale romanization of Cantonese was developed by Gerard P. Kok for his and Parker Po-fei Huang's textbook Speak Cantonese initially circulated in looseleaf form in 1952 but later published in 1958. Unlike the Yale romanization of Mandarin, it is still widely used in books and dictionaries, especially for foreign learners of Cantonese. It shares some similarities with Hanyu Pinyin in that unvoiced, unaspirated consonants are represented by letters traditionally used in English and most other European languages to represent voiced sounds. For example,  is represented as b in Yale, whereas its aspirated counterpart,  is represented as p. Students attending The Chinese University of Hong Kong's New-Asia Yale-in-China Chinese Language Center are taught using Yale romanization.

Despite originally being a romanisation scheme to indicate pronunciations, some enthusiasts actually employ the Yale romanisation to explore writing Cantonese as an alphabetic language, elevating it from its assistive status to a written language in effect.

Initials

Finals 

 Only the finals m and ng can be used as standalone nasal syllables.

Tones 

Modern Cantonese has up to seven phonemic tones. Cantonese Yale represents these tones using a combination of diacritics and the letter h. Traditional Chinese linguistics treats the tones in syllables ending with a stop consonant as separate "entering tones". Cantonese Yale follows modern linguistic conventions in treating these the same as the high-flat, mid-flat and low-flat tones, respectively.

Examples 

Sample transcription of one of the 300 Tang Poems by Meng Haoran:

See also 
 Cantonese phonology
 Jyutping
 Guangdong Romanization
 Cantonese Pinyin
 Sidney Lau romanisation
 S. L. Wong (phonetic symbols)
 Barnett–Chao Romanisation
 Yale romanization of Mandarin
 Yale romanization of Korean

References

Further reading

External links
 Comparison chart of Romanization for Cantonese with Yale, S. Lau, Guangdong, Toho and LSHK (uses Shift JIS encoding)
 MDBG free online Chinese-English dictionary (supports Cantonese Yale romanization)

Cantonese romanisation
Writing systems introduced in 1970
Languages of Hong Kong